The Burning Land is the fifth historical novel in The Saxon Stories by Bernard Cornwell, published in 2009. The story is set in the 9th-century Anglo-Saxon kingdoms of Wessex, Northumbria and Mercia. The first half of season 3 of the British television series The Last Kingdom is based on this novel.

Uhtred of Bebbanburg wins a victory against Danish invaders threatening Alfred the Great's kingdom of Wessex. When Uhtred unintentionally kills a Christian priest who insulted his dead wife, Alfred demands heavy reparations of Uhtred. Instead, Uthred breaks his oath to Alfred and sets off viking, but eventually returns to Mercia because of his oath to Aethelflaed, Alfred's daughter, and ends the (immediate) Danish threat.

This novel, and the series of which it is the fifth part, has been well received. One reviewer remarks "Vivid descriptions of merciless battlefield slaughter, rape, and destruction are artfully related by a masterful storyteller." Another comments on the series and its viewpoint varying from the Anglo-Saxon Chronicle, saying "Historical novels stand or fall on detail, and Mr Cornwell writes as if he has been to ninth-century Wessex and back." Another again praises Cornwell's eye for historical detail, and "his capacity for pulling off deft reverses are still in place, which helps to keep the narrative turning briskly along."

Plot summary

892 – 893:  Uhtred of Bebbanburg is now the preeminent warlord of Wessex, Alfred the Great's kingdom. Always in poor health, Alfred urges him to swear an oath to Alfred's son and presumptive heir, Edward. Uhtred is unwilling to do so, as that would interfere with his yearning to retake his family's stronghold at Bebbanburg in Northumbria, stolen from him by his uncle Aelfric after his father's death.

Uhtred is military governor of Lundene (London), sharing power with Bishop Erkenwald, whom he dislikes, but respects. Wessex is threatened by two separate Danish forces who have landed in Cent (Kent). Uhtred delivers Alfred's bribe to Jarl (Earl) Haesten, who leads the smaller army, to get him to leave, so that he can deal with the more serious threat posed by Jarl Harald Bloodhair. Uhtred objects to the bribe, as he knows that Haesten is completely untrustworthy. While travelling with a small force to meet Alfred, Uhtred captures Skade, Harald's woman and a reputed sorceress. Harald arrives, leading Saxon captive women, and threatens to kill all of them if Skade is not returned to him. When he starts butchering his prisoners before Uhtred's eyes, Uhtred releases Skade. Skade curses Uhtred as she and Harald make their escape.

Uhtred devises a plan to lure Harald into a trap. The plan works brilliantly. Uhtred and Alfred's men rout Harald's forces and again take Skade prisoner. Harald is severely wounded, but escapes to Torneie Island (Thorney Island), with a few followers. The island's natural defences and a palisade he builds make it too costly to attack him, but he is trapped there.

Uhtred is devastated by the news that his beloved wife, Gisela, has died in childbirth, along with the child she bore. When Uhtred and Skade return to Lundene, the cleric Godwin denounces Gisela, ranting that Gisela was the devil's whore and has come back from the dead as Skade. Uhtred flies into a rage and kills him accidentally. As punishment, Alfred orders Uhtred to pay a huge fine and swear an oath to Alfred's son Edward. Alfred holds Uhtred's children as hostage to his terms, and places them in the custody of Aethelflaed, Alfred's daughter and wife of Aethelred, the ealdorman of Mercia. Furious, Uhtred reneges on his oath to Alfred and sails, with Skade, to Dunholm in Northumbria, stronghold of his old friend Ragnar, a Danish leader. Uhtred trusts Aethelflaed to protect his children.

Uhtred needs money to gather men to attack Bebbanburg. Skade claims that Skirnir, her hated husband and Frisian pirate, has a hoard, so Uhtred sails to Frisia. On the voyage, he and Skade become lovers. After he defeats and kills Skirnir, he is disappointed when Skirnir's treasure hoard fails to match Skade's description. When Skade demands half of the hoard as her share, Uhtred denies it to her. From that point on, Skade becomes his enemy. Uhtred winters at his close friend Ragnar's fortress at Dunholm.

That winter, they receive news that Alfred has died. Ragnar and two other powerful Northumbrian jarls, Cnut and Sigrid, plot to attack Wessex. During the meeting, an uninvited Haesten arrives and offers to attack Mercia first, to distract Alfred and draw away some of his forces. When Haesten leaves, Skade surprises Uhtred by going with him. Uhtred is caught in a conflict of loyalties, between the Danes with whom he was raised, and his oaths to Alfred and Aethelflaed. He also fears for his children's safety. His indecision is broken when his friend, the Welshman Father Pyrlig arrives. Pyrlig reminds Uhtred that he has given his oath to serve Aethelflaed, and "oaths made in love cannot be broken". 

Aethelred, Aethelflaed's husband, wishes to divorce her to break free of Alfred's domination of Mercia. He directs Lord Aldhem to rape Aethelflaed, which would give Aethelred the excuse of "adultery" to divorce her. Uhtred kills Aldhem, frees Aethelflaed, and reunites with his children. He and Aethelflaed then go to Aethelred's council, surprising him before the assembled Mercian lords. Warning of Jarl Haesten's advance, Uhtred tries to win the Mercian lords to his and Aethelflaed's side, asking them to bring their men to Lundene. Because Aethelred holds the purse-strings, only Lord Elfwold comes. Uhtred and Aethelflaed become lovers. Uhtred learns that Alfred had advised Aethelflaed to use Uhtred's oath to her to bring him back. Eventually, Steapa, Alfred's retainer and Uhtred's friend, brings an army of twelve hundred of Alfred's best house troops, along with Edward. Uhtred again refuses to give his oath to Edward.

With these reinforcements, Uhtred decides to attack Haesten's two forts at Baemfleot (Benfleet), although Haesten is not there. Uhtred encounters and attacks a larger Danish force and is surrounded. He nearly loses the battle and his life, but is saved by Steapa's timely arrival with Alfred's troops. They capture one fort. The second is tougher, but Uhtred eventually takes it too.

In the hall, Uhtred finds Skade and a hoard of gold. Harald Bloodhair, crippled and vengeful over Skade's betrayal with Haesten, suddenly appears, embraces her and kills her. He then asks Uhtred to kill him. Uhtred does, then meets with Edward, who says that he does not need Uhtred's oath as long as his sister has it. Uhtred and Aethelflaed then sail away.

Characters

Fictional
Uhtred Ragnarson, the protagonist and narrator, dispossessed Ealdorman of Bebbanburg
Gisela – Uhtred's wife
Stiorra – Uhtred's daughter
Uhtred Uhtredson – Uhtred's son
 Osbert – Uhtred's youngest child
Steapa Snotor – A huge, fierce Saxon warrior, captain of Alfred's house troops
 Father Willibald  – A British priest and friend of Uhtred
Father Pyrlig – A Welsh priest and warrior who is a close friend of Uhtred
Sihtric Kjartanson  – Kjartan's illegitimate son, sworn to Uhtred
Father Beocca  – Uhtred's friend and teacher
Osferth  – Alfred's illegitimate son, now a member of Uhtred's household troops
Ralla  – Uthred's shipmaster
Finan  (the Agile) – Irish ex-slave, Uhtred's close friend and captain of Uhtred's household troops
Rypere  – A Saxon, one of Uhtred's household troops and oath-men
Cerdic  – One of Uhtred's household troops and oath-men
 Ragnar Ragnarson  – Jarl of Dunholm (Durham), blood-brother to Uhtred
 Brida  – Ragnar's East Anglian wife
 Rollo  – Oath-man of Ragnar, fought with Uhtred in Frisia
 Jarl Harald Bloodhair  – Danish earl, initially Skade's lover, enemy of Alfred and Uhtred
 Skade  – Danish woman, wife of Skirnir, at various times Uhtred's lover and enemy
 Offa  – A Saxon, formerly a priest, now ostensibly an entertainer with trained dogs, but in reality a purveyor of information
 Aelfric of Bebbanburg  – Uhtred's uncle, possessor of Bebbanburg, (Bamburgh Castle) Uhtred's hereditary home.
 Skirnir  – Frisian chieftain and pirate, husband of Skade
 Brother Godwin  – A blind monk, beholden to Bishop Asser and claimed to speak directly with God
 Aldhelm  – Mercian lord, underling of Aethelred
 Guthlac  – Reeve of Dumnoc (Dunwich, Suffolk)

Historical
King Alfred of Wessex (Alfred the Great) – King of Wessex
Aelswith – A Mercian princess in her own right, wife of King Alfred, mother of Aethelflaed and Edward
Bishop Asser – Welsh monk, religious advisor to King Alfred, enemy of Uhtred
Aethelflaed – King Alfred's daughter and wife to Athelred
Aethelred – Ealdorman of Mercia, Alfred's son-in-law and Uhtred's cousin
Edward Aethling – Alfred's son and heir apparent to the throne of Wessex
Earl Haesten – A Danish jarl (earl), who previously broke a life-oath to Uhtred who is now a dangerous enemy, seemingly based on a Viking leader of the same name recorded in the Anglo-Saxon Chronicle
Erkenwald – Alfred's civilian ruler of Lunden; Uhtred rules the garrison. Seemingly based on St. Erkenwald, an Anglo-Saxon bishop of London, who lived two centuries prior to the events of this novel.
Eohric of East Anglia – Danish king of East Anglia, Alfred's weak ally
Constantin – Prince of Alba (Scotland) under King Domnal. Later to become King Constantine II of Alba

Lists
On 31 October 2009, the book was number 5 on the hardback best-seller list of the Evening News (Edinburgh, Scotland)

Reviews

Publishers Weekly finds the action-packed novel to be artfully related by a masterful storyteller.

Slathered in blood and gore, Saxon warlord Uhtred of Bebbanburg hacks his way through the ninth century in the exciting fifth installment to bestseller Cornwell's Saxon Tales series (following Sword Song). This action-packed novel continues the saga of warfare for supremacy in Britain, a brutal period when Saxon and Danish swords, battleaxes, and treachery ruled the day. By now, Alfred the Great is old and feeble, unwilling and unable to repel the Danish invaders. He relies on trusty pagan warlord Uhtred, but Uhtred's temper and an unexpected violent act force Uhtred to break his oath of loyalty to Alfred and flee north with his men, intending to reclaim his ancestral home. En route, they face marauding Danish armies, betrayal, battles for a pirate treasure, and the curse of a vicious Danish witch, only to eventually be manipulated back into fighting for Alfred. Vivid descriptions of merciless battlefield slaughter, rape, and destruction are artfully related by a masterful storyteller. Uhtred is victorious in some battles, but the outcome of others will have to wait for the sequel.

Tom Shippey has strong praise in a detailed review of this novel, praise for the series, for this novel's portrayal of ninth-century Wessex, and for filling a gap in the written records, records written by Alfred's supporters.

We have good historical sources for what happened next, notably an early life of Alfred written by Bishop Asser and the Anglo-Saxon Chronicle, annals compiled by anonymous scribes across two centuries. But both works were written by Alfred's supporters and intended to burnish his legend. "The Burning Land" opens accordingly with Uhtred as an old man, angrily burning what seems to be a copy of the "Chronicle" for the lies it tells. His own story is the true one, he insists. "The Burning Land" proceeds to tell it.

What Mr Cornwell is doing—it's often a good strategy for a historical novelist—is writing into a gap in our knowledge. The Anglo-Saxons, for instance, thought they'd won a big battle at Farnham in 893, but the "Chronicle" is strangely silent on who was leading them. Why? We know that it wasn't Alfred, who was occupied elsewhere. Was the leader his son-in-law Æthelred, Alfred's candidate for ruler (but not king) of Free Mercia? How did Alfred intend to realize his dream of assimilating Free Mercia, reconquering Danish Mercia, and rolling up the other kingdoms to create, for the first time ever, a political unit called "England"?. . .

Historical novels stand or fall on detail, and Mr Cornwell writes as if he has been to ninth-century Wessex and back. He gives a graphic sense of what it's like to stand in a defensive shield-wall and how you go about breaking one. Each of his battles poses different tactical questions and gets imaginatively different answers. His accounts of fire and slaughter, and of Viking methods of extorting money, would seem gruesomely exaggerated if they weren't so often based on old legends or confirmed by archaeology.

In Uhtred, Mr Cornwell has given us a great character: quite a nice guy, underneath, but in a permanent bad temper as a result of disastrous, unrealistic and ungrateful higher management. Much has changed since the ninth century, but some things, and some feelings, are timeless.

Curtis Edmonds is pleased with the development of Uhtred, the main character. While wishing Uhtred could stop being used by so many larger forces and instead follow his own desires, Edmonds knows that would be the end of The Saxon Tales, and there are more tales to tell. "It’s hard enough to write one novel, but it’s downright difficult to pen five of them consecutively with the same characters and themes and keep the writing fresh and interesting. 'Difficult' isn't even the word; 'impossible' is more like it.  ... This is not to denigrate THE BURNING LAND in any way; it’s superior entertainment (if you like your entertainment blood-stained and brutal). Uhtred is a fully-realized character, capable of great bravery and great foolishness, mixed in with—as he might describe himself—the deviousness of Loki and the thunder of Thor’s hammer in battle. And Cornwell’s eye for period detail and his capacity for pulling off deft reverses are still in place, which helps to keep the narrative turning briskly along."

"The only thing to dislike about THE BURNING LAND is that it didn’t go in the direction that the main character (and at least this part of the readership) wanted it to go. But that means that the issue of who holds Bebbanburg Castle will be resolved in another volume, and given Cornwell’s talents, that will be a book to wait for indeed."

Adaptation
This novel is the basis for the first half of season 3 of The Last Kingdom.

References

2009 British novels
The Saxon Stories
Novels by Bernard Cornwell
HarperCollins books